A Virginia Romance is a 1916 silent short film directed by Charles Belmore and starring Francis X. Bushman and Beverly Bayne. It was produced and distributed by Metro Pictures. 
Writer Charles A. Taylor was at one time married to Laurette Taylor.

Cast
Francis X. Bushman - Ralph Everly
Beverly Bayne - Georgia Daniels
Lester Cuneo - Harry Daniels
Helen Dunbar - Mrs. Daniels

References

External links

1916 films
American silent short films
Metro Pictures films
American black-and-white films
Silent American drama films
1916 drama films
1910s American films